Dr Barclay Barrowman JP, DTM, FCO, FRSH was a British medical doctor who conducted early research on malaria.  Barrowman also served as the personal physician to the Sultan of Selangor.

Early life
Barrowman was born on 10 March 1896 in the Kelvin area of Glasgow, Scotland. He was the youngest child of John Barrowman (1844-1900), a lime merchant and Helen Agnew (1854-?).

After graduating from Glasgow University, Barrowman joined the Royal Naval Volunteer Reserve, serving in World War I as a surgeon. After the war, he returned home to Glasgow, where he worked as a general practitioner.

In 1928 Barrowman married Marguerite Emily Burn (born 18 January 1901), the daughter of Sir Joseph Burn and wife Lady Emily H Burn.

Service in Malaya
After earning a Diploma of Tropical Medicine and Tropical Hygiene from the University of Liverpool, Barrowman moved to British Malaya.  After working for several years in Sir Malcolm Watson's estate practice at Klang, Barrowman took over the practice.

In 1937, Barrowman was appointed Personal Physician to the Sultan of Selangor, who gave him the title "Dato'Semboh Di Raja of Selangor, Malaya". Working as a malariologist, Barrowman made advances in the treatment and prevention of malaria, writing several articles on the subject.  He also worked to improve conditions for the local labour force and ran instructional courses. Barrowman served as President of the BMA Malayan Branch and was appointed a Justice of the Peace by the Sultan's successor. 

After the Japanese invasion of Malaya in World War II, Barrowman fled Malaya.  He served in the Royal Army, achieving he rank of Colonel.  He advised the Australian Military Forces, then the Malayan Planning Unit of the War Office in London.  At the end of the war, Barrowman returned to Malaya as a Lieutenant-Colonel, serving with the Military Administration as Advisor in Malariology.

Later years
In 1947, Barrowman retired due to ill health.  A new highway to Port Swettenham, Malaya was named Barrowman Road after his retirement.

Barrowman died on 31 January 1978 in Elstree and Potters Bar Registration District leaving a Will which was probated on 19 April 1978 in Winchester. There is an obituary in the British Medical Journal, 1978, i, p. 514.

Personal
Barclay and Marguerite Barrowman had two children: Gillian Emily Barrowman who was born around 1931 in Malaya and Gavin Renfrew Barrowman who was born 1933 in Kuala Lumpur. 

Mrs Marguerite Barrowman published Life As Remembered From Rydal Mount (1905-1927) which has been published by The Potters Bar and District Historical Society

References 

National Archives

Wellcome Archive

Dr Barclay Barrowman (1896–1978), medical practitioner in Malaya:`Notes on a demonstration of malaria control’, for League of Nations Health Organisation course, and related items, 1934–1947

BARROwMAN, Barclay: Receives the Malay title of " Dato Semboh di Raja," 244

Barrowman, Barclay: Surgeon Sub-Lieutenant, Royal Naval Volunteer Reserve.

1938 Barrowman, Dr. Barclay, Dato, Federal Dispensary, Klang, Selangor F.M.S

New Selagor Justice

Sultan of Selagor with Dr Barrowman photograph

Prophylaxis of Malaria correspondence from Dr B. Barrowman published in the BMJ

Medical doctors from Glasgow
1978 deaths
1896 births
Malariologists